Progesterone-induced-blocking factor 1 is a protein that in humans is encoded by the PIBF1 gene. It has been shown to localize to the centrosome and has also been named CEP90.

References

External links

Further reading

Centrosome